Fetch the Compass Kids is the fifth full-length album by New Jersey indie rock band Danielson Famile. A portion of the album was recorded by Steve Albini in Chicago at his Electrical Audio studios.

Track listing
 "We Don't Say Shut Up"  – 2:06
 "Let Us ABC"  – 2:31
 "Good News for the Pus Pickers"  – 3:51
 "Fetch the Compass Kids"  – 3:43
 "Rallying the Dominoes"  – 3:03
 "Sing to the Singer"  – 3:16
 "The Wheel Made Man"  – 2:35
 "Singers Go First"  – 2:58
 "Fathom the Nine Fruits Pie"  – 2:37
 "Who the Hello"  – 3:55
 "Can We Camp at Your Feet"  – 5:19
 "Farmers Serve the Waiters"  – 4:58

References

Danielson Famile albums
2001 albums
albums produced by Steve Albini
Secretly Canadian albums
Fire Records (UK) albums